Oscar Riesebeek (born 23 December 1992 in Ede) is a Dutch cyclist, who currently rides for UCI ProTeam .

Major results

2009
 1st  Overall Grand Prix Rüebliland
2010
 2nd Overall Munsterland Giro Juniors
1st Stage 1
 2nd Overall Keizer der Juniores
2015
 1st  Mountains classification, Czech Cycling Tour
 3rd Parel van de Veluwe
 4th GP Viborg
 8th Grote Prijs Jef Scherens
 8th La Roue Tourangelle
2016
 1st Omloop der Kempen
 7th Sundvolden GP
 10th Ringerike GP
2017
 6th Omloop Mandel-Leie-Schelde
 9th Overall Circuit de la Sarthe
2018
 2nd Druivenkoers Overijse
 3rd Overall Four Days of Dunkirk
 7th Overall Circuit de la Sarthe
2019
 3rd Overall Circuit de la Sarthe
 4th Ronde van Overijssel
 4th Memorial Rik Van Steenbergen
 4th Circuit de Wallonie
 4th Veenendaal–Veenendaal Classic
2020
 1st  Overall Tour Bitwa Warszawska 1920
1st Stage 4
2021
 3rd Road race, National Road Championships
 8th Overall Tour of Belgium
 8th Heistse Pijl
 9th Brabantse Pijl
2022
 1st Dwars door het Hageland
 9th Overall Tour of Belgium

Grand Tour general classification results timeline

References

External links

1992 births
Living people
Dutch male cyclists
People from Ede, Netherlands
Cyclists from Gelderland
21st-century Dutch people